The Free Confederation of Chadian Workers (CLTT) is a trade union centre in Chad. It was formed in 1991 by members from the dissolved National Confederation of Trade Unions of Chad.

The CLTT is affiliated with the International Trade Union Confederation.

References

Trade unions in Chad
International Trade Union Confederation
1991 establishments in Chad
Trade unions established in 1991